Manuel Altagracia Cáceres y Fernández, sometimes called Memé (1838 in Azua – 1878) was a Dominican politician.  He served as president of the Dominican Republic from January 3, 1868 until February 13, 1868. He also served as General-In-Chief of the Dominican Republic from January 22, 1874 to April 6, 1874.

References

|-

1838 births
1878 deaths
People from Azua Province
Dominican Republic people of Spanish descent
Presidents of the Dominican Republic
Vice presidents of the Dominican Republic
Dominican Republic military personnel